Larkin Covered Bridge may refer to:

Larkin Covered Bridge (Chester Springs, Pennsylvania), listed on the National Register of Historic Places in Chester County, Pennsylvania
Larkin Covered Bridge (North Tunbridge, Vermont), listed on the National Register of Historic Places in Orange County, Vermont